KZOI (1250 AM) and its translator at 97.1 FM is a radio station licensed to serve Dakota City, Nebraska. The station is owned by Joaquin Garza's Fiesta Radio, through licensee La Fiesta 971, LLC. It airs a regional Mexican format.

The station was assigned the call letters KTFJ by the Federal Communications Commission on April 28, 1988, and changed to the current KZOI on March 6, 2014.

In November 2017, KZOI changed their format from 80s hits to Regional Mexican, branded as "La Fiesta 97.1".

Previous logo

References

External links

Radio stations in Nebraska